Clash or The Clash may refer to:

Culture

Events 
 Busch Light Clash, a motor racing event
 Clash of the Champions, a National Wrestling Alliance and World Championship Wrestling event
 WWE Clash of Champions, a WWE event

Music 
 Clash cymbals, a musical instrument
 Sound clash, a battle between two bands
 Clash (magazine), a British music magazine
 "Clash", a 2012 song by Caravan Palace from Panic
 "Clash", a 2020 song by Diljit Dosanjh from G.O.A.T.
 "Clash" (song), a 2021 song by British rapper Dave
 "Clash" or "Clashes", terms used to refer to Battle rap between a pair

Bands 
 The Clash, an English punk rock band
 Clash (band), a Thai rock band, from Bangkok
 The Clash at Demonhead, fictional band listed in List of Scott Pilgrim characters

Albums 
 The Clash (album), the 1977 titular album
 Clash (Holger Czukay and Dr. Walker album), 1997

Video games 
 Clash (video game), 1998 turn-based strategy game for MS-DOS and Microsoft Windows
 Battle Clash, 1992 Super NES light gun shooter
 Mario Clash, 1995 Virtual Boy game
 Clash of Clans, 2012 mobile game
 Clash Royale, 2016 spinoff of Clash of Clans
 Clash at Demonhead, 1989 NES game

Television 
 Clash!, a 1990 game show, aired until 1991, on Comedy Central
 Clash (Justice League Unlimited episode), 2005
 The Clash (TV program), a Philippine reality show on GMA Network

Film 
 Clash (2009 film), a Vietnamese film
 Clash (2016 film), an Egyptian film
 Clash (2021 film), a Nigerian film

Other uses in culture 
 Clash (novel), a 1929 novel by Ellen Wilkinson
 Kevin Clash (born 1960), a puppeteer who performs the muppet Elmo
 Attribute clash, a color graphics artifact predominantly on the ZX Spectrum
 Clash (comics), a Marvel comics character associated with Spider-Man

Multiple entries 
 Clash of the Titans (disambiguation)
 Clash of the Gods (disambiguation)

Other uses 
 A small battle
 Cluster Lensing And Supernova survey with Hubble (CLASH)
 Darnell Clash (born 1962), an American football player
 Kevin Clash (born 1960), an American puppeteer, director and producer
 The Clash of Civilizations, a 1996 controversial sociological theory advocated by Samuel P. Huntington
 Clash (app), an American short-form video hosting service and social network

See also 
 Conflict (disambiguation)